Lindsey Day is the president, co-founder, and editor-in-chief of CRWN Magazine, the world’s first natural hair magazine. Day, also a management consultant, grew up in California with her interracial parents.

CRWN Magazine is a natural hair and lifestyle magazine that celebrates women of color. Prior to releasing CRWN's first issue on August 27, 2016, Day worked for Interscope Records for 6 years and edited for the Livelevated blog. Witnessing the economic crash during her time at Interscope pushed Day to create her own movement, which started with her co-founding the online magazine Made Women, another female-centered endeavor that helped women in the business world connect.

"CRWN is truly a lifestyle magazine. We are serving a woman who is more educated, well-traveled and sophisticated than ever before—largely because generations before us have fought to ensure our seats at the table” Day said in a 2016 interview with The Huffington Post.

Her mother's battle with breast cancer push her further to create CRWN. For years, Day recalled she and her friends always straightening their hair, but after seeing her mother's transition in health following her breast cancer diagnosis, she was motivated to embrace her hair as a black woman.

Day is currently the owner of Blossm Consulting Group, a management consulting firm that specializes in business model innovation and digital marketing.

References

External links 
 Lindsey Day's Twitter
 CRWN Magazine's website
 Blossm Consulting Group's website

Year of birth missing (living people)
Living people
African-American women writers
American magazine editors
Women magazine editors
Organization founders
21st-century African-American people
21st-century African-American women